Calvin Twigt (born 30 January 2003) is a Dutch professional footballer who plays as a midfielder for Eredivisie side FC Volendam.

Career
Twigt started his youth career with SC Buitenveldert before moving to the academy of FC Volendam. On 12 September 2020, he made his debut for Jong FC Volendam in the Tweede Divisie in the 0–3 away loss to Rijnsburgse Boys. 

On 16 October 2020, Twigt made his professional debut in the first team, in the 5–1 home win over Jong PSV. He came on as a substitute for Boy Deul in the 88th minute. On 23 February 2021, Twigt made his first ever start for Volendam in the 3–2 win against Jong Ajax. On 6 May 2021, Twigt signed a new contract with Volendam until 2024. 

He scored his first goal for Volendam on 27 August 2021 in a 5–0 win over MVV.

Career statistics

References

External links

2003 births
Living people
Footballers from Amsterdam
Dutch footballers
Association football midfielders
SC Buitenveldert players
FC Volendam players
Eerste Divisie players
Tweede Divisie players